Chattogram City Corporation Literary Award  is an annual literary award introduced by Chattogram City Corporation This award has been given in February every year since 2014 in recognition of outstanding contributions in various branches of Bengali literature at the national level.

Award
Each recipient is awarded a standard medal and prize money.

List of awardees by year

2014
In 2014, awards and receptions were given to 5 people for their contribution in various fields of literature.

 Swapan Dutt (Poetry)
 Ferdous Ara Alim (Fiction)
 Mahibul Aziz (Essays and Research)
 Muhammad Nasir Uddin (World Literature)
 Fahmida Amin (Children's Literature)

2015
In 2015, awards and receptions were given to 5 people for their contribution in various fields of literature.

 Moyukh Chowdhury (Poetry)
 Biswajit Chowdhury (Fiction)
 Moniruzzaman (Essays and Research)
 Siddique Ahmed (World Literature)
 Iqbal Babul (Children's Literature)

2016
Literary awards and receptions were given to 6 people for their contribution in various fields of book fair of Chittagong City Corporation at the premises of Muslim Institute Hall in Chittagong city in February 2016.

 Kamruzzaman Jahangir (posthumous)
 Fauzul Kabir (Poetry)
 Hafiz Rashid Khan (Article)
 Nur Mohammad Rafiq (Research)
 Khurshid Anwar (World Literature)
 Rashed Rouf (Children's Literature)

2017
Literary awards and receptions were given to 6 people for their contribution in various fields of book fair of Chittagong City Corporation at the premises of Muslim Institute Hall in Chittagong city in February 2017.

 Mohit ul Alam (Fiction)
 Arun Dasgupta (Poetry)
 Mahbubul Haque (Essay)
 Bipul Barua (Children's Literature)
 Milon Chowdhury (Drama)
 Avik Usman (Drama)
 Mahfuzur Rahman (Liberation War Research)

2018
In February 2017, 3 people were awarded literary prizes and receptions.

 Rafiq Anwar (Fiction, Posthumous)
 Naser Rahman (Fiction)

References

Chittagong
Bangladeshi literary awards
Bengali literary awards
2014 establishments in Bangladesh